10 to 4 at the 5 Spot is a live album by saxophonist Pepper Adams' Quintet which was recorded at the Five Spot Café in 1958 for the Riverside label.

Reception
Allmusic awarded the album 4 stars. In his review, Michael G. Nastos states, "This album, one of the first club dates recorded for the Riverside label, may have presented logistic problems with the acoustics, mic placements, and reel to reel tape technology, but there were no such issues with the extraordinary music contained on this effort... There's a palpable sense of democracy, shared values, and above all, balance in this band of expert modern jazz pioneers. It's a keeper, and one of the best recordings of any band in this era". The Penguin Guide to Jazz awarded the album 3 stars (out of 4) stating "The live session, made with a frequent partner at the time, Donald Byrd, is typical of Adams's kind of date, with muscular blow-outs of the order of 'Hastings Street Bounce' sitting next to a clear-headed ballad reading of 'You're My Thrill'; That said it's sometimes only the novelty of hearing a baritone in the ensembles that lifts the music out of a professional hard-bop routine".

Track listing

Personnel 
Pepper Adams – baritone saxophone 
Donald Byrd – trumpet (tracks 1 & 3–5)
Bobby Timmons – piano
Doug Watkins – bass
Elvin Jones – drums

References 

1958 live albums
Pepper Adams live albums
Albums produced by Orrin Keepnews
Riverside Records live albums
Albums recorded at the Five Spot Café
Live instrumental albums